St Columb's College is a Roman Catholic boys' grammar school in Derry, Northern Ireland and, since 2008, a specialist school in mathematics. It is named after Saint Columba, the missionary monk from County Donegal who founded a monastery in the area. The college was originally built to educate young men into the priesthood, but now educates boys in a variety of disciplines.

St Columb's College was established in 1879 on Bishop Street (now the site of Lumen Christi College), but later moved to Buncrana Road in the suburbs of the city.

Early history 
St Columb's College was preceded by several failed attempts to create such an institution in Derry. Repeated but sporadic efforts were made to maintain a seminary for almost a century; at Clady, near Strabane, in the late eighteenth century, at Ferguson's Lane in Derry in the early nineteenth century and at Pump Street (first reference to St Columb's College as such) in the city from 1841 to 1864.

St Columb's finally opened its doors on 3 November 1879 with two priest teachers, Edward O'Brien and John Hassan. The school was considered to be quite large at the time and was expected to accommodate 20–30 boarders. The school quickly gained a reputation for academic achievement. On 18 September 1931 the Derry Journal listed St Columb's College's academic results. They were as follows:

 2 university scholarships
 3 exhibitions and prizes
 6 calls in King's Scholarship exam (calls to teacher training)
 2 pupil teacherships
 8 regional committee scholarships
 31 passed matriculation
 26 passed Senior Leaving Cert. exam
 52 passed Junior Leaving Cert. exam

The Education Act 1947 and expansion 
One of the most notable alumni of St Columb's College, John Hume, noted, "When the history of St. Columb's College in this century is written, it will be clear that one of its major transformations, if not its major transformation, took place as a result of the Eleven Plus examination."

The Education Act 1947 provided for free secondary education to all throughout the United Kingdom. Entry to St. Columb's College, a grammar school, would be determined by one's performance in the 11-plus or Transfer Test. The immediate result was an explosion in pupil numbers, a shortfall in teaching staff and greater pressure on existing resources. In 1941 the student body numbered 263. By 1960 the number stood at 770 with a teaching staff of 35. In under twenty years the school's size had tripled. It was now clear that additional facilities would be needed.

In September 1973 St. Columb's College opened a new campus on the Buncrana Road in the city. The new site would cater for the senior years; its initial enrolment was of 900. The new building was designed by Frank Corr of Corr & McCormick and constructed by J Kennedy & Co. The total cost was £762,000. This figure does not include the £56,000 spent employing W & J McMonagle Ltd to construct the playing fields.

Sport 
The school has a long and successful sporting history, with its students competing in many events across the country. It has excelled in soccer, Gaelic football, basketball and has produced many athletes.

Nobel Prize winners
The school claims two Nobel laureates amongst its alumni. They are:
Seamus Heaney – Nobel Prize in Literature, 1995
John Hume – Nobel Peace Prize, 1998 (shared with David Trimble)

Notable former pupils

The college's former pupils association makes an annual award (the Alumnus Illustrissimus Award) to "a past-pupil who has achieved something of major significance or has made a considerable contribution in his own field".
Notable winners of the award are as follows:

Other alumni and names associated with St Columb's include:

The Boys of St Columb's
St Columb's featured in the film The Boys of St Columb's made by West Park Pictures and Maccana Teoranta for RTÉ. Following the lives of several Irish figures including Nobel laureates Seamus Heaney and John Hume who all attended the same small school in Derry in the 1950s and have helped transform modern Ireland. The Boys of St Columb's was released on DVD in early March 2010 by Digital Classics DVD.

Presidents of St Columb's College

References

External links
St Columb's College Official Website

Grammar schools in Derry (city)
Catholic secondary schools in Northern Ireland
Educational institutions established in 1879
Boys' schools in Northern Ireland
1879 establishments in Ireland
Specialist colleges in Northern Ireland